Joanne Marie Pavey MBE (née Davis, born 20 September 1973) is a British long-distance runner representing Europe, Great Britain and England in a career notable for its longevity, range and consistency. A World, European and Commonwealth medallist, Pavey won her only senior title when she claimed the 10,000 m gold medal at the 2014 European Championships in Zürich, ten months after giving birth to her second child, to become the oldest female European champion in history at the age of 40 years and 325 days. 

Pavey is a five-time Olympian, having represented Great Britain in every Olympic Games from 2000 to 2016. She is the only British runner and track event athlete to have competed in five games. She is also the 2012 European Championship silver medallist in the 10,000 m and a two-time 5000 m medallist at the Commonwealth Games, winning silver in Melbourne 2006 and bronze, aged 40, in Glasgow 2014.

At global level, her best results include bronze in the 10,000 m at the 2007 World Championships and fifth in the 5000 m at the 2004 Olympic Games. In 2015 media reports stated that 2007 silver medalist Elvan Abeylegesse had been found, on retesting, to have taken a prohibited substance, and suspended by IAAF. Confirmed in 2017, this elevated Pavey to the bronze medal, her first World Championship medal.

Earlier in her career she competed in the 1500 metres, 3000 metres and 5000 metres distances. From 2007 onwards, she focused on longer distances, ranging from 5000 m to the marathon. She has personal best times of 4:01.79 (1500 m), 8:31.27 (3000 m), 14:39.96 (5000 m), 30:53.20 (10,000 m) and 2:28:24 (marathon).

An eleven-time national champion at distances between 1500 metres and the Marathon, she is coached by her husband and manager Gavin Pavey, with whom she has two children.

Career

Early career
Born in Honiton, Devon, since 1987 Jo Pavey (née Davis) has been a member of Exeter Harriers Athletics Club in Devon, England. In March 1988 she started to be coached by the middle distance coach Tony White.

In July 1988 she won the English Schools 1500 m title in a British record (under 15). Running for Devon, she finished eight places and 13 seconds ahead of Paula Radcliffe, running for Bedfordshire. Pavey then won the AAAs national U15 800 m and 1500 m titles in 1988 and the AAAs national U17 800 & 1500 m titles in 1990. She made her Great Britain & NI debut in Athens in 1989 as a fifteen-year-old competing as an under twenty.

Pavey made her senior international debut in 1997. After finishing her degree in physiotherapy, she spent the off-season backpacking, which meant an irregular training schedule. Over the course of the season she improved with each race over the 1500 m and went on to win the British national title. At the 1997 World Championships in Athens, she reached the semi-finals.

A six time national champion in the women's 5000 m and a former British recorder holder at 3000 m indoors. She first moved up to the 5000 m in 2000, after coming back from a two-year absence caused by hip and knee injuries. In her first race at the distance she comfortably achieved the Olympic qualifying standard. This meant she was selected for the British team for the 2000 Summer Olympics in Sydney. Pavey reached the Olympic final, where she improved her personal best by 10 seconds to finish 12th and record a sub fifteen minute 5000m in her first year at the event.

Pavey's Olympic performance in her debut year at 5000m set her up for a bright future at 5000m, and she entered the 2001 season with the aim of rivalling the national record. She spent the winter doing warm weather training in South Africa. Having trained for only half an hour a day during much of the 2000 season due to injury worries, Pavey gradually built up her training. However, a shin injury meant she missed the first month of her season. Her first race of the year was the 3,000 m in a meeting at Lausanne, in which she finished seventh. Two weeks later she won the British 5,000 m title, and in doing so gained selection for the World Championships in Edmonton.

The women's 5,000 m at the Edmonton championships featured a controversy over the participation of Olga Yegorova, who had tested positive for erythropoietin (EPO), but had her suspension overturned. Several athletes, including the British team, discussed whether to boycott the event, but decided against it.

After another winter of warm weather training in South Africa, Pavey started the 2002 season with a 3,000 m performance which was at the time the fastest in the world that year. Pavey missed the trials for the Commonwealth Games due to a virus. She returned in the European Cup, where she finished second to Olga Yegorova in the 5,000 m.

On the eve of the 2002 Commonwealth Games, Pavey had a bacterial infection that caused her face to swell, but recovered in time to compete. In the race she held bronze medal position with 600 m to go, but tied up severely and finished fifth. She required assistance to leave the track, and did not leave the stadium for another three hours as she received medical attention. Her condition was later attributed to a magnesium deficiency together with the infection. A Golden League meeting at the end of August brought a new 3,000 m personal best of 8:31.27. In the next Golden League meeting a week later, Pavey gained a new 5,000 m personal best of 14:48.66.

For the first time in her senior career, in 2003 Pavey started the season by running cross country races. As part of the Great Britain team in the 2003 IAAF World Cross Country Championships, she finished 40th. As the track season started, Pavey won the 3000 m at a meeting in Lille, and posted her two fastest 1500 m times. This prompted her to focus on the shorter distance at the 2003 World Championships in Paris, six years after last running 1500 m at a major championships. Pavey surpassed her 1997 performance by reaching the final. She was second with one lap remaining, but faded and finished tenth. Pavey was pushed by another athlete into lane three in the final straight and was passed by a number of athletes. As an athlete ranked in the top 12 in the world in both the 3000m and 1500m, Pavey was invited to compete in the IAAF World Athletics Final in Monaco. She finished fourth in the 1500 m in a personal best 4:01.79, and the following day finished third in the 3000 m. Pavey had continued to train as a 5000m runner in 2003 but ran a series of impressive 1500m races with 4:02.03 Rome, 4:03.91 Madrid and at the Paris World champs a slow tactical heat in 4:08.60, semi final of 4:03.78 and final of 4:03.03. She then won in Rieti with 4:04.46 before her final race of 4:01.79 in Monaco. In November Pavey achieved the first major cross country win of her career at the trials to determine the British team for the European Cross Country Championships. However, illness meant she had to withdraw from the championships.

Jo Pavey set a national record for 3000 m indoors in February 2004 in Birmingham, England and broke this record in January 2007 in Stuttgart, Germany with a time of 8:31.50. The year of 2004 was a vintage year during which she won a European Bronze medal in the European Cross Country Championships, a fifth place over 5000 m in the 2004 Summer Olympics in Athens and a national indoor record over 3000 m. In 2005 and 2006 she was Europe's fastest 5000 m runner. She has won the National Championships at 5000 m on six occasions (2001, 2004, 2006, 2007, 2008, 2012) and in 2007 and 2008 she won both the 5000 m and the 10,000 m. In 2010, she added a third 10000m title and then in 2014, just eight months after giving birth by c-section, she won a fourth national 10000m title. Her first UK national title came at 1500m in 1997 giving a seventeen-year span between her first senior title and her 10000m victory in 2014.

She has doubled up at various championships including eight place in the 5000 m following her bronze medal in the 10,000 m in the 2007 World Championships in Athletics. However, in the 2004 Olympic Games she ran a 5000 m semi-final at midnight and then a late-night 5000 m final (fifth place) and followed this punishing schedule by attempting to run the 1500 m heats the following day. She did not progress beyond the 1500 m heats.

During 2003, without pace makers, she finished fourth in the 1500 m with a 4:01.79 clocking and third in the 3000 m with a time of 8:37.89 at the World Athletics Final in Monaco. In cup events she has won two European Cup titles and representing Europe she was third in the 2002 IAAF World Cup over 5000 m and third in the 2004 IAAF Continental Cup, again over 5000 m. (The World Cup was renamed The Continental Cup). Pavey was the women's European team captain for the 2014 Continental Cup.

Track and road running
Most of her career has been as a track runner but since 2006 she made a gradual move to road running. After illness ruled her out of the Olympic 5000 m and led to a disappointing twelfth place in the 2008 Beijing Olympic Games 10000m, she immediately announced her intentions of continuing her career until 2012 and a potential move up in distance to the marathon. Her road running career major race wins have included the Great South Run (2006, 2012) and the Great Manchester Run (2007, 2008). She also finished 3rd (winner Gete Wami, Ethiopia) in the Great North Run (2008) in the closest finishes the event has seen with two seconds covering the first three athletes.

In 2005 Pavey front ran a 5000m in 14:40.71 only to be overtaken on the final lap by a chasing pack of six Kenyan and Ethiopian athletes. She improved to 14:39.96 in 2006 at the Brussels Golden League when finishing third behind Tirunesh Dibaba and Meseret Defar.

She won bronze in the 10000 m at the 2007 World Championships in Athletics, behind Tirunesh Dibaba. She qualified to compete in the 5000 m and 10000 m at the 2008 Beijing Olympics. Due to illness she did not start in the 5000 m but finished twelfth in the 10000 m event, with a time of 31:12.30.

At the beginning of the 2009 athletics season, Pavey revealed that she was pregnant and, as a result, she would miss both the 2009 London Marathon and 2009 World Championships. In September 2009, Jo and her husband Gavin Pavey, had their first child, Jacob Matthew Pavey. He arrived nine days ahead of the original birth date, weighing 5 lb 9oz.

She returned to competition in April 2010, finishing second to Freya Murray at the Great Ireland Run, but she was not disappointed and said she was very pleased with a strong return race after her year out. Her marathon debut at the Virgin London Marathon in April led to a 2:28:23 Olympic A standard. She then ran in the ING New York City Marathon finishing in a time of 2:28:42, which given the hilly nature of the race represented a significant improvement on her London time. Pavey sustained stress fractures in both the summer of 2010 and 2011. She was not selected for the British marathon team after missing the 2012 London Marathon, but came second at the European Cup 10000m in June and her time of 31:32.22 minutes was within the qualifying standard.

Pavey also ran an Olympic Games A standard for 5000m at the British Milers Club meeting in Manchester, England and a further 5000m A standard at Rome's Golden Gala Diamond League meeting. Just three days after competing in Rome she ran the 10000m A standard in the European Cup. After winning the UK Championships and Olympic Trials at 5000m she qualified for her fourth Olympic Games at the age of 38 years. Pavey is the only female athlete in the modern era to have competed over 1500m, 5000m and 10000m at an Olympic Games and World Championships.

At the 2012 European Championships in Helsinki Pavey won a silver medal in the 10000m in a time of 31:49.03.

Pavey finished seventh in both the 5000m and 10000m at the London 2012 Olympic Games. She was the first European in both races with the top six places in the 5000m all going to Kenyan and Ethiopian athletes. Her time of 30:53.20 in the 10000m is not only the second fastest ever by a British athlete but also the second fastest time in history by an over 35-year-old behind Kenya's Edith Masai.  Masai's time has not been ratified by World Masters Athletics, who currently lists Pavey as the world record holder. Pavey was Europe's fastest 10000m runner in 2012. Pavey won the 2012 Great South Run in a time of 53:01 to reclaim the title she won for the first time six years previously.

Her bronze medal time, behind a pair of young Kenyans, at the 2014 Commonwealth Games of 15:08.96 bettered the listed W40 World Record by almost 12 seconds, however Pavey ran an even better time of 15:04.87 at the Golden Gala two months earlier. The Commonwealth Games race was probably one of the most exciting races of her career. In the closing four laps Pavey battled the Kenyans refusing to give up the lead. She went to the front, after being overtaken on three occasions. On the final bend the Kenyan runners had all gone past her again and opened a small gap but Pavey battled back again down the home straight overtaking one of the Kenyan athletes and narrowly missing the Silver medal by 6/100th of a second.

Ten days after the Commonwealth Games, Pavey won her first major championship, the 10,000 meters at the European Championships, just a little more than a month before turning 41, becoming the oldest female to win a gold medal in the history of the championships, more than three years older than the previous holder of the distinction (Lyubov Gurina, age 37 in 1994).  Only 1950 British Marathoner Jack Holden was an older gold medalist. Pavey finished her 2014 season with bronze in the Continental Cup in Marrakech, Morocco. She was given the honour of being named the female captain of the European Team which won the Continental Cup ahead of the Americas, Africa and Asia-Pacific.

After the 2014 season Pavey received various awards. She finished in third place in the 2014 BBC Sports Personality of the Year behind Lewis Hamilton (Formula One) and Rory McIlroy (Golf). She was named British Sports Women of the Year at the SJA Awards. Other awards included British Athletics - British Athlete of the Year, British Athletics Writers Association - British Female Athlete of the Year, British Athletics Supporters Club - British Athlete of the Year, Daily Mirror - British Inspirational Sports Performance of the Year, Cosmopolitan Magazine - Ultimate Sports Women of the Year, Daily Mail - The Ian Wooldridge Award for British Sports Person of the Year, Inspiration Awards - Inspirational Celebrity of the Year, British Milers Club - Athlete of the Year, Athletics Weekly Magazine - British Athlete of the Year, British Performance of the Year and British Master of the Year and various other national and regional awards. She was also honoured with the Freedom of the City of Exeter and an honorary doctorate from the University of Exeter.

Pavey opted to sit out the 2015 World Championships and eased back on her tough training schedule. Despite this she still competed in a handful of races including a 69:58 hilly half marathon in Scotland. She also ran an over 40 world record for 10 miles of 52:44 at the Great South Run in Portsmouth, England.

Pavey returned to competition in 2016 with the aim of competing in a fifth Olympic Games. Despite suffering from a chest infection and virus, she lined up in the British Championship and Olympic Trials 10,000 metres on 21 May. A top two finish inside the qualifying time of 32:15 would have guaranteed selection, but Pavey was well below her best and struggled home in sixth in 33:22. The illness persisted for around six weeks making it seem extremely unlikely that she would qualify for her fifth games. Pavey travelled to Boston, USA for a 10000m race in which she hoped to gain the Olympic qualifying time. When she arrived in the USA the race was cancelled. Her last chance was to run the European Championship in Amsterdam on 6 July. Pavey finished in a time of 31:34.61 (official over 40 world record). This was the fastest time run by a British athlete in 2016 and Pavey also finished ahead of the British Olympic Trial winner. A week later her selection for a historic fifth games was announced by the selectors.

At the Rio Olympic Games, Pavey finished in 15th place. Pavey became the first British runner and the first British track athlete to compete in five Olympic Games. In the sport of athletics two other non track event athletes from the UK have also competed in five games or more, javelin thrower Tessa Sanderson with six appearances and walker Chris Maddocks with five appearances. Like Pavey Maddocks also comes from the English county of Devon. At the age of 42 years 11 months, Pavey also became the oldest British track competitor at an Olympic Games. Her time of 31:33.44 is recognised as the official world record/best by an over 40, although Kenyan Edith Masai ran an unratified 31:31.18 in 2007.

Pavey continues to compete at the age of 45. At the London 2017 World Championships she was finally awarded her bronze medal for the Osaka World Championships 10000m.

International competitions

Other events
 2012 Great South Run – first place (10 miles)
 2008 Great North Run – third place (half marathon)
 2008 Great Manchester Run – first place (10k)
 2007 Great Manchester Run – first place (10k)
 2006 Great South Run – first place (10 miles)
 2003 IAAF World Athletics Final – third place (3000 m)
 2003 IAAF World Athletics Final – fourth place (1500m)

Personal life
Jo Pavey (née Davis) started running at the King's School, Ottery St Mary, where teachers encouraged her to join an athletics club. A road near the school fields where she trained as a school girl has been named, 'Pavey Run', in her honour. She joined Exeter Harriers in 1987, where an early coach was Tony White. In 1997 she was coached by Mike Down (Bristol) and in 2000 by Christina Boxer, the 1982 Commonwealth Games 1500m champion.
Jo was first coached by her husband and manager Gavin Pavey in the winter of 1996/97 and he resumed the coaching role in 2001. He has coached her to finals at all the major championships. Jo made the final at every major outdoors championships between 2000 and 2008 before child birth in 2009.

Pavey studied physiotherapy at Bristol University, graduating in 1995.

She married Gavin Pavey in 1995, whom she met at Exeter Harriers in 1988. They have a son Jacob (born in 2009) and daughter Emily (born in 2013).

Pavey released her autobiography in July 2016, Jo Pavey: This Mum Runs.

In 2019 Pavey appeared on BBCs "Pointless Celebrities" charity edition, partnered with Presenter Ade Adepitan, reaching but failing to win in the final rounds answers.

A personal trademark is that she always runs wearing long white compression socks.

References

External links

1973 births
Living people
People from Honiton
English female middle-distance runners
English female long-distance runners
English female marathon runners
British female middle-distance runners
British female long-distance runners
British female marathon runners
Olympic female middle-distance runners
Olympic female long-distance runners
Olympic athletes of Great Britain
Athletes (track and field) at the 2000 Summer Olympics
Athletes (track and field) at the 2004 Summer Olympics
Athletes (track and field) at the 2008 Summer Olympics
Athletes (track and field) at the 2012 Summer Olympics
Athletes (track and field) at the 2016 Summer Olympics
Commonwealth Games silver medallists for England
Commonwealth Games bronze medallists for England
Commonwealth Games medallists in athletics
Athletes (track and field) at the 2006 Commonwealth Games
Athletes (track and field) at the 2014 Commonwealth Games
World Athletics Championships athletes for Great Britain
European Athletics Championships winners
European Athletics Championships medalists
British Athletics Championships winners
UK Athletics Championships winners
AAA Championships winners
World record holders in masters athletics
Medallists at the 2006 Commonwealth Games
Medallists at the 2014 Commonwealth Games